Alexis Roland-Manuel (22 March 18911 November 1966) was a French composer and critic, remembered mainly for his criticism.

Biography
He was born Roland Alexis Manuel Lévy in Paris, to a family of Belgian and Jewish origins. He studied composition under Vincent d'Indy and Albert Roussel. As a young man he befriended composer Erik Satie, who helped him to make numerous influential connections. In 1911, Satie introduced Roland-Manuel to Maurice Ravel, whose pupil, friend and biographer he soon became.

In 1947, he was appointed Professor of Aesthetics at the Conservatoire de Paris, where he remained until his retirement in 1961, making many contributions to musical theory and criticism, even assisting Igor Stravinsky by ghost-writing the theoretical work "The Poetics of Music". In addition to theoretical works, he wrote and composed various works for stage, especially comic operas, and screen, developing a partnership with director Jean Grémillon, for five of whose films he composed the scores.

Roland-Manuel's criticism included several monographs on the music of Ravel from the perspective of a respectful pupil and a lifetime friend. The titles include "Ravel", "Ravel et son oeuvre" and "Ravel et son oeuvre dramatique".

Arthur Honegger dedicated Pastorale d'été to Roland-Manuel.

He died in Paris in 1966.

Selected works

Stage
Isabelle et Pantalon (1922)
 Canarie (1927; for the children's ballet L'éventail de Jeanne, to which ten French composers each contributed a dance)
 Le Diable amoureux (1929), opera based on the novel The Devil in Love by Jacques Cazotte
 Canarie (1952: for the collaborative orchestral work La guirlande de Campra)
 Jeanne d'Arc (1955)

Film scores
 Little Lise (1930)
 The Dream (1931)
 Partir (Departure, 1931)
 The Brighton Twins (1936)
 The Strange Monsieur Victor (1938)
 Remorques, (Stormy Waters, 1941)
 Summer Light (1943)
 Le Ciel est à vous (The Woman Who Dared, 1944)

References

External links
 
 

Writers from Paris
1891 births
1966 deaths
20th-century classical composers
French male classical composers
French music critics
French ballet composers
French male non-fiction writers
20th-century French composers
20th-century French male musicians
20th-century French male writers
Ravel scholars